Arseny Dmitrievich Mironov (25 December 1917 – 3 July 2019) was a Russian scientist, aerospace engineer, and aviator. He was one of the oldest researchers in aircraft aerodynamics and flight testing, a Gromov Flight Research Institute (GFRI) director from 1981 to 1985, a recipient of the Stalin Prize in 1948 and the USSR State Prize in 1976, and an honorary citizen of Zhukovsky.

Mironov contributed to aviation engineering and research through the GFRI, serving as a flight test engineer, researcher, and director. He turned 100 in December 2017.

Early life 
Mironov was born in Vladimir. His father was Dmitry I. Mironov (1884–1956), an engineer-electrician who worked for hydroelectric power station Klasson in Moscow Oblast and later for electric company Mosenergo in Moscow. His mother was Maria Mikhailovna Ilyicheva (1889–1982), who was a housewife.

Two years after leaving school, Mironov worked as a factory electrician.

Career

Early years 
In 1936, Mironov entered the Moscow Aviation Institute (MAI) at a new course Flight Testing and graduated in 1941. In May 1941, he started working for the Gromov Flight Research Institute (GFRI) within the Minaviaprom of the USSR.

Scientific career 
In the GFRI, Mironov primarily did engineering and research. He started as a flight test engineer just three days before the beginning of the Great Patriotic War. During the war, he participated in the serial production of fighter planes, which included flight and ground testing (to eliminate quality defects in the aircraft's flying and fighting capabilities) conducted by the GFRI and aircraft manufacturers.

Post-war, Mironov developed methods for aerodynamic research using free-flying models, making a breakthrough in collecting in-flight data concerning wing profile pressure distribution at transonic speeds. As a lead scientist, he organized the GFRI's flight research in aeroplanes' physical aerodynamics and associated environment effects, including the sonic boom impact of supersonic aeroplanes.

In 1968-1975, Mironov together with V. S. Grachev conducted flight studies of the aerodynamic characteristics of an experimental ogival delta wing designed for the then developing supersonic airliner Tupolev Tu-144. These studies were conducted at the GFRI on one of the two specially created testbed aeroplanes MiG-21I (I - from the imitator). The research flights were performed by Igor Volk, Oleg Gudkov and Vladislav Loychikov.

Mironov participated in the development and implementation of the Aircraft Testing Handbooks, a series of official guides for the flight and ground testing of military aircraft. He played a major role in the USSR's communication with the International Civil Aviation Organization in the development of aircraft type certification and noise regulation, especially for supersonic transport aeroplanes.

As a member of investigation commissions, Mironov was closely involved in the investigation of aviation accidents, including the March 1968 MiG-15 training flight accident involving Yuri Gagarin and Vladimir Seryogin, the 1972 Il-62 airliner crash near Nerskoye Lake, and others. Regarding the MiG-15 training flight accident, Mironov developed and publicly supported a scientifically-grounded position against numerous different explanations and conspiracies.

Mironov became the head of the GFRI's research division. Later, Mironov became his first deputy after veteran Max Taitz. When Utkin died in 1981, Mironov became the institute's chief (1982), serving until  was appointed in 1985. From 1981 to 1985, Mironov was a head of the Aerophysical and Flight Research Department within the Aeromechanics and Flight Engineering Faculty of the Moscow Institute of Physics and Technology.

From 1996 to 2019, Mironov worked for the GFRI as a principal researcher in human factors and flight safety.

Flight career 
Since childhood, Mironov was interested in aviation and aircraft modelling. While studying in the MAI, he completed the initial flight training course at MAI's aero-club with a U-2 pilot license. He later completed gliding flight training and made several parachute jumps.

In a group of students visiting the GFRI, Mironov met with then-chief Mikhail Gromov and explained his plans to be a test pilot, to which Gromov responded, "Will see". Since his early days in the institute, Mironov was involved in aircraft flight testing as a test engineer, navigator, and transport pilot. On 4 October 1943, an accident occurred in the La-5 aircraft's test flight with Mironov in the flight crew—a mid-air collision with air defence patrol fighter Yak-1, whose pilot violated normal procedure flying too close to a test aeroplane. Mironov was severely wounded and spent five months in a hospital. Lasting issues in his left elbow hindered Mironov's ability to train and apply for a test pilot position. However, he passed the check flight with the institute's senior test pilot, proving he could fly light transport aeroplanes such as the Po-2. After the incident, Mironov frequently piloted aircraft, including the Po-2 and the Yakovlev UT-1. He completed hundreds of transport flights and obtained a USSR fourth class air transport pilot license. Until 1950, he was also involved in test flights as navigator and flight test engineer on aircraft such as the Il-2, Pe-8, Tu-2, and Yak-9.

Mironov's flight training in gliding started before the war in Chkalov Central Aero-club in Moscow under the supervision of Sergey Anokhin. Mironov's flight instructor was Margarita Ratsenskaya, the aero-club's gliding squad commander and Anokhin's wife. Due to a mutual interest in gliding, Mironov became closely acquainted with Oleg Antonov and frequently piloted the Antonov A-15 glider.

Family 
Mironov was married to Olga Yevgenevna Rudneva (1919–2017) for 77 years. Rudneva studied in the same class in the MAI with her future husband. She worked at Kazan Aviation Plant and for the GFRI as a lead flight test engineer.

The couple had two children. Their son, Mikhail Mironov (born 1944), is a Doctor of Physics and Math and an acoustic scientist working for the Andreyev Acoustics Institute. Their daughter, Olga Maksakova (Mironova) (born 1946) is a psychotherapy practitioner and a Doctor of Medicine working for the Burdenko Neurosurgery National Research Center.

There are also two grandsons and one granddaughter.

Awards 
 Stalin Prize (1948) for development and implementation of a new method for aerodynamics research. 
 USSR State Prize (1976) for flight testing and introduction into service the Su-24 tactical bomber.
 Order of Lenin (1971).
 Order of the Red Banner of Labour (1957).
 Order of the Badge of Honour (1966).
 Jubilee Medal "In Commemoration of the 100th Anniversary of the Birth of Vladimir Ilyich Lenin" (1970).
 Jubilee Medal "Thirty Years of Victory in the Great Patriotic War 1941–1945" (1975).
 Medal "Veteran of Labour" (1985).
 Honoured Aircraft Engineer.
 Master of Sport of the USSR in gliding.
 Zhukovsky Honorary Citizen. 
 Gromov Medal: highest corporate award of the GFRI (2011).

On his 100th birthday ceremony on 25 December 2017, Mironov was awarded a Chest Badge "Medal of Small Arms Maker M.T. Kalashnikov" by the Russian Ministry of Industry and Trade.

Memorials 

Mironov is buried together with his wife Olga at the Bykovskoye Memorial Cemetery in Zhukovsky.

Bibliography 
Between the early 1980s and mid-1990s, as a chief editor and author, Mironov contributed to the book series Aviation Test Engineer Reference Bibliotheca, which consist of ten and a half monographs on different research and methodical aspects of aircraft flight testing. Mironov's major contributions include the following books:
 
 
 

As an author and consulting editor, Mironov contributed in the academic publication, 

Mironov's other publications include:
 Mironov's publications in the international online catalogue WorldCat
 
 
 
 
 
 
 
 
 
 
 
 
 
 
 
 
 
 
 
 

In 2017, Mironov published a short autobiography:

References

External links 

 
 
 Colleagues interviewed about A. D. Mironov (video, part 1, in Russian)
 Colleagues interviewed about A. D. Mironov (video, part 2, in Russian)

1917 births
2019 deaths
Aerodynamicists
Aerospace engineers
Glider pilots
Men centenarians
People in aviation
Russian aerospace engineers
Russian aviators
Russian centenarians
20th-century Russian engineers
Academic staff of the Moscow Institute of Physics and Technology
Gromov Flight Research Institute employees
Soviet aerospace engineers
Soviet aviators